Richard Boath is a British banker, the former Barclays global co-head of finance.

Early life
Richard Boath is the son of a senior chemicals company executive
, and a former Miss Manchester. He has a bachelor's degree in management science from the University of Manchester.

Career
Boath started his career in 1980 with Bank of America as a corporate banking account officer. In 1982, he joined Security Pacific, then in 1988, Merrill Lynch, and in 1990 Salomon Brothers, before joining Barclays in 2000, rising to co-head of financial institutions for Europe, the Middle East and Africa (EMEA) by 2013 and chairman of the bank's EMEA financial institutions group in 2014. I

In 2016, Boath left Barclays and is pursuing an employment law claim against the bank, adjourned in December 2016.

Barclays fraud case
In June 2017, following a five-year investigation by the UK's Serious Fraud Office covering Barclays' activities during the financial crisis of 2007–2008, the former Barclays chief executive John Varley and three former colleagues, Roger Jenkins, Thomas Kalaris and Boath were charged with conspiracy to commit fraud and the provision of unlawful financial assistance.

In February 2020, Boath, along with Thomas Kalaris and Roger Jenkins, were found not guilty on all charges.

References

1958 births
Living people
Barclays people
British bankers